The Voice van Vlaanderen is a Belgian reality talent show. The 1st season of the Flemish version premiered on November 25, 2011 on the vtm television network.

The coaches for the debut seasons were Natalia Druyts, one of the most popular recording artists of Flandern and close runner-up of the first season of Idool, Koen Wauters, host and judge of several casting shows and band member of Clouseau, Jasper Steverlinck, who was topping the Flemish single charts with a cover of Life on Mars and Alex Callier from Flemish band Hooverphonic. The winner of this season was Glenn Claes from team Jasper.

Blind auditions

Episode 1: November 25, 2011

Episode 2: 2 December 2011

Episode 3: 9 December 2011

Episode 4: 16 December 2011

Episode 5: 23 December 2011

Episode 6: 30 December 2011

The Wildcards

Battles
Coaches begin narrowing down the playing field by training the contestants with the help of "trusted advisors". Each episode featured eight battles consisting two of pairings from within each team, and each battle concluding with the respective coach eliminating one of the two contestants; the six winners for each coach advanced to the live shows.

 – Battle Winner

Episode 7: 6 January 2012

Episode 8: 13 January 2012

Episode 9: 20 January 2012

Episode 10: 27 January 2012

The Sing-off
Each coach nominates 5 acts from their group to advance to the live shows. The 3 remaining acts per group will do a sing-off for the remaining live show spot.

Live shows
 — Contestant was in the bottom and immediately eliminated by the coach
 — Contestant was in the bottom and saved after the Sing-Off by the coach
 — Contestant was in the bottom and eliminated after the Sing-Off by the coach

Episode 11: 3 February 2012

Episode 12: 10 February 2012

Episode 13: 17 February 2012

Episode 14: 23 February 2012

Episode 15: 2 March 2012

Semifinals: 9 March 2012

Semi-final results

Finals: 17 March 2012

After Snow Patrol performed Bert Voordeckers and Iris Van Straten, who placed 4th and 3rd respectively, were eliminated with Glenn Claes and Silke Mastbooms advancing to the superfinal. Glenn performed his single "Knight in Shining Armour" and Silke sang "Awake". The results were postponed for the next day.

Final results

Summaries

Results table

Team Jasper

Team Koen

Team Alex

Team Natalia

Summary of competitors
Competitors' table
 – Winner
 – Runner-up
 – Third
 – Fourth
 – Eliminated

Ratings

References 

1
2011 Belgian television seasons
2012 Belgian television seasons